"Hanging Tree" is the second track on Counting Crows' 2008 album Saturday Nights & Sunday Mornings.

Song Meaning

Duritz has cited in interviews that the angst he felt not being around his grandmother for a long time due to frequent touring, up until her death while he was in Perth, Australia, inspired this song:

Duritz explained in an April 2008 interview the broader meaning of the song:

As with the tracks "Sundays" and "Insignificant", imagery pertaining to the Greek myth of Icarus appears in the song, specifically in the lyric: "I got a pair of wings for my birthday and I'll fall down through the sun this evening."

Duritz reportedly preferred having either this song or "When I Dream of Michelangelo" released as the lead single, as he believed either one of those tracks better represented the album as a whole thematically, in contrast to "You Can't Count on Me".

References

Counting Crows songs
2008 songs
Songs written by Adam Duritz
Songs written by Dan Vickrey